The Human Factors and Ergonomics Society (HFES) is an interdisciplinary nonprofit professional organization, headquartered in Washington, D.C., within the so-called Potomac Chapter of the organization. Founded in 1957, HFES now claims 4500 members worldwide. HFES has 67 active chapters throughout the United States, Canada, and Europe; 42 of these are student chapters, and 23 are technical groups.

Members of HFES address a broad spectrum of issues arising in the growing field of human factors and ergonomics. In addition to the Human Factors journal, produced by an independent contractor, HFES publishes the ANSI/HFES-100 standard for ergonomic workstation setups, approved by the American National Standards Institute (ANSI) in 2007. [may need to list other such separate publications here; also needs "Contents box" with outline to include "History" of the organization, crediting its founders and pioneers --  as named in citation below; probably should also include a subsequent paragraph on "Qualifications for Membership" and such distinctions as Fellow status.]

History [Insert Contents box and headings for proper paragraph identations  by font]

Among it's most distinguished members was human factors pioneer Paul Fitts.  See also Wesley E. Woodson , author of the original Human Engineering Guide for Equipment Designers, 1954, widely known for its ubiquitous use in military and aerospace applications of human factors engineering concepts and principles.

Qualifications for Membership

References

External links 

Professional associations based in the United States
Art and design-related professional associations
Architecture-related professional associations
Scientific societies based in the United States
Scientific organizations established in 1957
1957 establishments in the United States